Lostine is a city in Wallowa County, Oregon, United States. The population was 213 at the 2010 census.

History
Lostine was named after a place by the same name in Cherokee County, Kansas, that served as the site of a short-lived farmers' post office in the 1870s. Lostine, Oregon, established a post office in August 1878; W.R. Laughlin was the first postmaster. Lostine was platted in 1884.

Geography
Lostine lies along Oregon Route 82 about halfway between Wallowa and Enterprise. Nearby is the Lostine River, a tributary of the Wallowa River, east of the Wallowa Mountains of northeastern Oregon.

Climate
This climatic region is typified by large seasonal temperature differences, with warm to hot (and often humid) summers and cold (sometimes severely cold) winters.  According to the Köppen Climate Classification system, Lostine has a humid continental climate, abbreviated "Dfb" on climate maps.

Demographics

2010 census
As of the census of 2010, there were 213 people, 95 households, and 57 families residing in the city. The racial makeup of the city was 93.0% White, 2.3% Native American, 3.3% Asian, and 1.4% from two or more races. Hispanic or Latino of any race were 1.9% of the population.

There were 95 households, of which 23.2% had children under the age of 18 living with them, 47.4% were married couples living together, 9.5% had a female householder with no husband present, 3.2% had a male householder with no wife present, and 40.0% were non-families. 32.6% of all households were made up of individuals, and 12.6% had someone living alone who was 65 years of age or older. The average household size was 2.24 and the average family size was 2.82.

The median age in the city was 46.5 years. 22.1% of residents were under the age of 18; 5.6% were between the ages of 18 and 24; 21.2% were from 25 to 44; 33.4% were from 45 to 64; and 17.8% were 65 years of age or older. The gender makeup of the city was 51.2% male and 48.8% female.

2000 census
As of the census of 2000, there were 263 people, 101 households, and 71 families residing in the city. The population density was 844.8 people per square mile (327.6/km). There were 118 housing units at an average density of 379.1 per square mile (147.0/km). The racial makeup of the city was 98.86% White, 0.38% Asian, 0.38% from other races, and 0.38% from two or more races. Hispanic or Latino of any race were 3.80% of the population.

There were 101 households, out of which 32.7% had children under the age of 18 living with them, 63.4% were married couples living together, 6.9% had a female householder with no husband present, and 29.7% were non-families. 23.8% of all households were made up of individuals, and 8.9% had someone living alone who was 65 years of age or older. The average household size was 2.60 and the average family size was 3.11.

In the city, the population was spread out, with 28.9% under the age of 18, 8.0% from 18 to 24, 23.2% from 25 to 44, 26.2% from 45 to 64, and 13.7% who were 65 years of age or older. The median age was 40 years. For every 100 females, there were 105.5 males. For every 100 females age 18 and over, there were 107.8 males.

The median income for a household in the city was $31,538, and the median income for a family was $35,536. Males had a median income of $31,250 versus $16,667 for females. The per capita income for the city was $13,388. About 7.0% of families and 13.3% of the population were below the poverty line, including 20.0% of those under the age of 18 and 14.8% of those 65 or over.

References

External links
 Entry for Lostine in the Oregon Blue Book

1884 establishments in Oregon
Populated places established in 1884
Cities in Oregon
Cities in Wallowa County, Oregon